Sarrak-e Olya (also Romanized as Sarrāk-e ‘Olyā; also known as Sarrāk-e Bālā) is a village in Howmeh-ye Sharqi Rural District, in the Central District of Izeh County, Khuzestan Province, Iran. At the 2006 census, its population was 941, in 155 families.

References 

Populated places in Izeh County